Udara albocaerulea, the albocerulean, is a butterfly of the family Lycaenidae. It was described by Frederic Moore in 1879. It is found from India (Simla to Assam) to Myanmar, Malaysia, Hong Kong, Taiwan and Japan.

Subspecies
U. a. albocaerulea (Yunnan)
U. a. scharffi (Corbet, 1937) (western Malaysia)
U. a. sauteri (Fruhstorfer, 1917) (Taiwan) (Udara sauteri is a synonym of Udara albocaerulea))
U. a. yamanotoi (Murayama, 1953) (Japan)

References

Butterflies described in 1879
Udara
Taxa named by Frederic Moore
Butterflies of Asia